George Martinez may refer to:

 George Martinez (mayor), former mayor of Maywood, California
 George Martinez (activist) (born 1974), American educator, activist, artist and hip-hop political pioneer
 George Martinez (American football) (born 1961), American football coach and former player